The Indian Sudoku Championship (commonly abbreviated as 'ISC') is an annual national contest held in India to crown the Indian Sudoku Champion and to select the national team for the Asian Sudoku Championship and World Sudoku Championship. It usually consists of multiple rounds of solving various classic sudoku and its variants, and the scores of players are aggregated for the final rankings. It is conducted by Logic Masters India (commonly abbreviated as 'LMI'), which is the Indian affiliate of the World Puzzle Federation.

Of the 15 national championships held so far, 9 have been won by Rohan Rao, 3 by Ritesh Gupta, 2 by Rishi Puri and 1 by Prasanna Seshadri. The latest ISC was held on 12 December 2021 and was won by 9-time champion Rohan Rao.

The national teams have been representing India at the World Sudoku Championship since 2007.

The qualifications for ISC 2022 is being held as a series of 4 online rounds in collaboration with Sudoku Mahabharat on LMI, followed by an offline finals.

History
The Indian Sudoku Championship has been held offline and online across the years and attracts the top solvers of India. It is a platform for sudoku authors to create their own sudokus for the event, as well as for sudoku enthusiasts to participate and solve them in a national championship involving various sudoku variants.

Since 2016, several online rounds were held across the year followed by an offline finals (except for 2020 and 2021 which were online due to COVID-19 pandemic).

In 2015, 2014, 2013 and 2009, the championship was held as an online contest.

In 2012, the championship was held in collaboration with Times Sudoku Championship (TSC), sponsored by Times of India.

In 2011, 2007 and 2008, regional rounds were held across the major Indian cities followed by an offline finals.

In 2010, the championship was held as part of Techfest, IIT-Bombay.

Results

Records 
There have been many interesting finals where top players had a close finish to determine the winner, but the best record is that of Rohan Rao, who has finished on the podium 12 times out of the 14 finals he competed in.

See also 
 Times Sudoku Championship (India)
 Asian Sudoku Championship
 World Sudoku Championship

References

External links
 Results of Indian Sudoku Championship 2021
 Results of Indian Sudoku Championship 2020
 Results of Indian Sudoku Championship 2019
 Results of Indian Sudoku Championship 2018
 Results of Indian Sudoku Championship 2017
 Results of Indian Sudoku Championship 2016
 Results of Indian Sudoku Championship 2015
 Results of Indian Sudoku Championship 2014
 Results of Indian Sudoku Championship 2013
 Results of Indian Sudoku Championship 2012
 Results of Indian Sudoku Championship 2011
 Results of Indian Sudoku Championship 2010
 Results of Indian Sudoku Championship 2009

Sudoku competitions
Annual events in India
Sudoku